Die Autohändler is a German mockumentary television series, broadcast since 2003 on RTL. The content for script is generally entertaining stories of car salesmen taking part in a fake documentary series.

External links
 

2003 German television series debuts
RTL (German TV channel) original programming
2010s German television series
German-language television shows